The Northern Tasmanian Football Association (NTFA) was an Australian rules football competition which ran from 1886 to 1986. In its time it was one of the three main leagues in Tasmania, with the Tasmanian Football League and North West Football Union representing the rest of the state. It was based in the city of Launceston.
The three most successful clubs of the old NTFA, Launceston, North Launceston and City-South, went on to compete in the short-lived TFL Statewide League.

From 1947 to 1983 the NTFA was a six team competition, in 1984 George Town and Deloraine joined to make eight teams.

In 1987, the NTFA merged with the North West Football Union to form the Northern Tasmanian Football League.

At the end of 1995 the Tasmanian Amateur Football Association disbanded, The southern clubs help form the Southern Football League, The northern clubs formed a competition called the Northern Tasmanian Football Association. There is no relationship between the old and new NTFA.

NTFA premierships

Winners by year

Most wins

Tasmanian State Premiership

This was contested semi regularly between the premiers of the Tasmanian Football League, North West Football Union and the NTFA.

The winners from the NTFA were – 
 1905 – North Launceston (unofficial)
 1906 – North Launceston (unofficial)
 1928 – City
 1930 – City
 1932 – City
 1933 – Launceston
 1934 – Launceston
 1935 – Launceston
 1937 – Launceston
 1938 – Launceston
 1947 – North Launceston
 1949 – North Launceston
 1950 – North Launceston
 1954 – City
 1957 – Longford
 1960 – City-South
 1966 – City-South
 1972 – City-South
 1973 – Scottsdale

Best and Fairests

Hardesty Cup
 1924 - L. J. Keogh
Tasman Shields Trophy
 1925 – Harold Wade
 1926 – Len Gaffney
 1927 – Len Gaffney, Fred Odgers
 1928 – Neil Edwards
 1929 – Jim Milbourne
 1930 – Leo Wescott
 1931 – Laurie Nash
 1932 – Laurie Nash
 1933 – Bill Cahill
 1934 – Jock Connell
 1935 – Ted Pickett
 1936 – Bill Cahill
 1937 – Fred Smith
 1938 – Max Pontifex, Fred Smith
 1939 – Jock Connell, Tom Ryan
 1940 – Lloyd Bennett
 1941 – Frank Horsenail
 1945 – Frank Horsenail
 1946 – Lance Crosswell
 1947 – Lance Crosswell
 1948 – Terry Cashion, Harry Styles
 1949 – Max Rees
 1950 – Terry Cashion
 1951 – Terry Cashion, Darrell Crosswell
 1952 – Bill Byrne, Charlie Dennis, Laurie Moir
 1953 – Laurie McGee
 1954 – Charlie Dennis, Laurie McGee
 1955 – Charlie Dennis
 1956 – Jim Ross
 1957 – John Fitzallen
 1958 – Jim Ross
 1959 – Bob Bye
 1960 – Bob Bye
 1961 – Eddie Thomas
 1962 – Darrell Pitcher
 1963 – Kevin McLean
 1964 – Charlie Thompson
 1965 – Nigel Wilson

Hec Smith Memorial Medal
 1966 – Barry Lawrence
 1967 – Peter Webb
 1968 – Alby Dunn
 1969 – John Burns
 1970 – John Davis
 1971 – Stuart Palmer
 1972 – Max Hadley
 1973 – Derek Peardon
 1974 – David Berne
 1975 – Ian Marsh
 1976 – Paul Ellis
 1977 – Stephen Nicholls
 1978 – Ricky Rattray
 1979 – David Noonan
 1980 – Grant Allford
 1981 – Paul Reinmuth
 1982 – Jamie Dennis
 1983 – Rod Thomas
 1984 – Jamie Dennis
 1985 – Stephen Howe
 1986 – Darren Cook
 1986 – Malcolm Upston

References
Full Points Footy: NTFA Summary Chart 1896 to 1986

Northern Tasmania
Defunct Australian rules football competitions in Tasmania